Honduras Salzburg was a Honduran football club based on El Progreso, Honduras.

History
They have only had two seasons in the Liga Nacional de Fútbol Profesional de Honduras. Honduras Salzburg withdrew for 2003–04 Apertura, selling their franchise to Victoria, which had been relegated in 2002–03 Clausura and were thereby allowed to stay up.

Achievements
Segunda División
Winners (1): 2001–02

League performance

All-time record vs. opponents
 As of 2002–03 Clausura

References

Football clubs in El Progreso
Defunct football clubs in Honduras
Association football clubs disestablished in 2003